The 2015–16 Scottish League Two (referred to as the Ladbrokes League Two for sponsorship reasons) was the 21st season in the current format of 10 teams in the fourth-tier of Scottish football. The last placed team entered a play-off with a team nominated by the Scottish Football Association from outside the SPFL to determine which team enters League Two in the 2016–17 season.

Teams

To League Two
Relegated from Scottish League One
 Stirling Albion

From League Two
Promoted to Scottish League One
 Albion Rovers

Stadia and locations

Personnel

Managerial changes

League table

Results
Teams play each other four times, twice in the first half of the season (home and away) and twice in the second half of the season (home and away), making a total of 36 games.

First half of season

Second half of season

Season statistics

Scoring

Top scorers

Hat-tricks

Note
4 Player scored 4 goals

Discipline

Player

Yellow cards

Red cards

Club

Yellow cards

Red cards

Awards

Monthly awards

League Two play-offs
The first round was contested between Cove Rangers and Edinburgh City, the winners of the Highland League and Lowland League respectively. City, the winners, then played off against the bottom club in League Two, East Stirlingshire, swapping with them and being promoted to the 2016–17 Scottish League Two with a victory.

Semi-finals

First leg

Second leg

Final

First leg

Second leg

References

Scottish League Two seasons
4
4
Scot